The Bandit Buster is a 1926 American silent Western film. Directed by Richard Thorpe, the film stars Buddy Roosevelt, Molly Malone, and Lafe McKee. It was released on December 19, 1926.

Plot
Henry Morton is a prominent banker. His daughter, Sylvia, and his wife feel that he is working too hard. Sylvia enlists the help of her friend, Buddy Miller, who has romantic aspirations towards her, to fake a kidnapping, taking her father to a secluded cabin where he can rest for a week or two. Miller and his friend, Romeo, take Morton and bring him to a lakeside cabin.

Unbeknownst to Morton's wife and daughter, he was in the midst of a large business transaction. When Morton's subordinates go to Mrs. Morton for instructions as to whether hold or sell Morton's stock, Mrs. Morton discusses the situation with Sylvia. Their discussion is overheard, and real kidnappers are informed of his whereabouts, and go to the cabin and conduct a real kidnapping.

When Mrs. Morton receives the ransom demand, she believes that Miller is behind the kidnapping, and was only pretending to "fake kidnap" her husband. Sylvia also has her doubts. However, Miller tracks down the real kidnappers and rescues Morton, who upon his return finds his holdings greatly enhanced, allowing him to retire. Sylvia understands she was incorrect about Miller, and the two end up together.

Cast list
 Buddy Roosevelt as Buddy Miller
 Molly Malone as Sylvia Morton
 Lafe McKee as Henry Morton
 Winifred Landis as Mrs. Morton
 Robert Homans as Romeo
 Slim Whitaker as Steve (credited as Charles Whitaker)
 Al Taylor as Hotel clerk

Production
A December 1926 article in Motion Picture News announced the release date as December 19, 1926. It gave credit for the story to Frank Inghram, while stating that Buddy Roosevelt as the star of the film, supported by Molly Malone, Lafe McKee, Winifred Landis, Robert Homans, Charles Whitaker (Slim Whitaker), and Al Taylor.

Reception
Moving Picture World gave the film a positive review, calling it a "snappy actionful western story."

References

External links
 
 

1926 Western (genre) films
1926 films
Films directed by Richard Thorpe
American black-and-white films
Associated Exhibitors films
Silent American Western (genre) films
1920s English-language films
1920s American films